Breynia is a plant genus in the family Phyllanthaceae, first described  in 1776. It is native to Southeast Asia, China, the Indian Subcontinent, Papuasia, Australia, and the island of Réunion.

The name Breynia is a conserved name, it is recognized despite the existence of an earlier use of the same name to refer to a different plant. Breynia L. 1753 is in the Capparaceae, but it is a rejected name. We here discuss Breynia J.R.Forst. & G.Forst. 1776.

In a 2006 revision of the Phyllanthaceae, it was recommended that Breynia be subsumed in Phyllanthus; however, new combinations in Phyllanthus for former Breynia species remain to be published.

Breynia are of special note in the fields of pollination biology and coevolution because they have a specialized mutualism with moths in the genus Epicephala (leafflower moths), in which the moths actively pollinate the flowers—thereby ensuring that the tree may produce viable seeds—but also lay eggs in the flowers' ovaries or in the space between the tepals and the carpel walls, from where their larvae consume a subset of the developing seeds as nourishment. Other species of Epicephala are pollinators, and in some cases, non-pollinating seed predators, of certain species of plants in the genera Phyllanthus and Glochidion, both closely related to Breynia. This relationship is similar to those between figs and fig wasps and yuccas and yucca moths.

Species
Breynia baudouinii Beille – Vietnam 
Breynia calcarea (M.R.Hend.) Welzen & Pruesapan – W Malaysia 
Breynia carnosa Welzen & Pruesapan – Vietnam 
Breynia cernua (Poir.) Müll.Arg. – Northern Territory of Australia, New Guinea, Solomon Islands, Sulawesi, Philippines, Borneo, Java  
Breynia collaris Airy Shaw – Papua New Guinea 
Breynia coriacea Beille – Vietnam 
Breynia coronata Hook.f. –  Thailand, W Malaysia, Borneo, Sumatra  
Breynia discigera Müll.Arg. – Thailand, W Malaysia, Sumatra  
Breynia disticha J.R.Forst. & G.Forst. – Vanuatu, New Caledonia; naturalized in West Indies, Florida, Gambia, and scattered oceanic islands 
Breynia diversifolia Beille – Vietnam 
Breynia fleuryi Beille – Vietnam 
Breynia fruticosa (L.) Müll.Arg. – Vietnam, Thailand, S China 
Breynia glauca Craib – Thailand, Myanmar, Laos, Borneo 
Breynia grandiflora Beille – Vietnam 
Breynia heyneana J.J.Sm. – Lesser Sunda Islands in Indonesia 
Breynia indosinensis Beille – Vietnam, Laos 
Breynia lithophila Welzen & Pruesapan – Thailand 
Breynia massiei Beille – Laos 
Breynia microphylla (Kurz ex Teijsm. & Binn.) Müll.Arg. – Sumatera, Java, Sulawesi 
Breynia mollis J.J.Sm. – New Guinea 
Breynia oblongifolia (Müll.Arg.) Müll.Arg. – Papua New Guinea, Queensland, New South Wales, Northern Territory 
Breynia obscura Welzen & Pruesapan – W Malaysia 
Breynia platycalyx Airy Shaw – W New Guinea 
Breynia podocarpa Airy Shaw – Papua New Guinea, Northern Territory 
Breynia pubescens Merr. – Maluku 
Breynia racemosa (Blume) Müll.Arg. – Andaman & Nicobar Islands, Thailand, Myanmar, W Malaysia, Sumatra, Java, Lesser Sunda Islands, Philippines, New Guinea, Bismarck Archipelago  
Breynia repens Welzen & Pruesapan – Thailand 
Breynia retusa (Dennst.) Alston – Réunion, India, Tibet, Sri Lanka, Nepal, Bhutan, E Himalayas, Myanmar, Thailand, Vietnam, W Malaysia  
Breynia rhynchocarpa Benth. – Northern Territory of Australia 
Breynia rostrata Merr. – Vietnam, S China 
Breynia septata Beille – Vietnam 
Breynia stipitata Müll.Arg. – Northern Territory, Queensland 
Breynia subangustifolia Thin – Vietnam 
Breynia subindochinensis Thin – Vietnam 
Breynia tonkinensis Beille – Vietnam 
Breynia vestita Warb. – New Guinea, Kai Island in Maluku Province of Indonesia 
Breynia virgata (Blume) Müll.Arg. – Sumatra, Java, Lesser Sunda Islands 
Breynia vitis-idaea (Burm.f.) C.E.C.Fisch. – China, Ryukyu Islands, Taiwan, Indochina, Andaman & Nicobar Islands, India, Bangladesh, Pakistan, Sri Lanka, W Malaysia, Sumatra, Philippines

Formerly included
Breynia subterblanca (C.E.C.Fisch.) C.E.C.Fisch, synonym of Sauropus subterblancus (C.E.C.Fisch.) Welzen

References

 
Phyllanthaceae genera